For My Parents is the sixth full-length album from Japanese post-rock band Mono. It was released in September 2012. The band also released a video for the opening song "Legend" titled "Legend: A Journey Through Iceland." The video was directed by Henry Jun Wah Lee.

Reception
For My Parents received positive reviews, Drowned in Sound said 'The band has progressed to a point where their work sounds unique, and now they'll continue to painstakingly develop every aspect of that work with each release' and Consequence of Sound said 'For My Parents isn’t likely to go down with your Slow Riot for New Zerø Kanadas or Spiderlands, but there are times when it seems to break new ground, amounting to maximal yet clearly produced spectacle that only a band as musically cognizant and technically fluent as Mono could muster'.

Track listing

Personnel
Mono
 Takaakira "Taka" Goto – Guitar
 Tamaki Kunishi – Bass, Piano, Glockenspiel
 Yoda – Guitar
 Yasunori Takada – Drums, Glockenspiel, Timpani, Tubular Bell, Gong

Production
 Henry Hirsch – Recorded
 Rachel Alina – Assisted
 Fred Weaver – Mixed
 Bob Weston – Mastered

The Holy Ground Orchestra 
 Jeff Milarsky – Conductor
 Yuki Numata, Courtney Orlando, Emily Ondracek, Patti Kilroy – Violin 1
 Conrad Harris, Ben Russel, Caroline Shaw, Amanda Lo – Violin 2
 Caleb Burhans, Nadia Sirota, Erin Wight, Jeanann Dara – Viola
 Clarice Jensen, Brian Snow – Cello 1
 Caitlin Sullivan, Laura Metcalf – Cello 2
 Logan Coale – Bass
 Shayna Dunkelman – Timpani
 Yuri Yamashita – Cymbals

References

Mono (Japanese band) albums
2012 albums